I W Jones Eng'r was an American engineering firm that operated from offices on Main Street in Milton, New Hampshire, from 1899 to 1930. The firm built water-powered factories and hydroelectric plants. Ira W. Jones was the principal of the firm.

Ira W. Jones
Ira W. Jones was born in Milton on June 10, 1854. His father was George H. Jones (1826 – after 1910), and his mother was Lucy Jane Varney (1827–1897). Ira had an older sister Addie V. (1848 - ?), an older brother Charles A. (1852 - ?), and a younger sister Nettie J. (1863 - ?). In the 1870 US census, Ira and his brother Charles are shown as working on their father's farm in Milton. However, in the 1880 census, while Charles is still shown as working on the farm, Ira's occupation at 25 years of age is shown as "sets water wheels". In the next available census from 1900, Ira was living in Lebanon, Maine, across the Salmon Falls River from Milton. He had married Lucia C. Wentworth in 1887 and had two children, Nettie age 13 and Mary age 8, at the time of the 1900 census. Ira's occupation was listed as hydraulic engineer in 1900. 

Jones's formal education began in the public schools in South Milton, New Hampshire. He graduated from Milton High School and went to Boston, Massachusetts, where he studied drafting at Starr King Drawing School. After completing at Starr King, Jones spent three additional years in Boston making patterns and models. He then spent four years learning the millwright trade before spending a year and a half with a Worcester, Massachusetts, machinery manufacturer as a machinist and draftsman. For the next 13½ years, from about 1887 to 1900, Jones worked selling equipment from machinery manufacturers in Dayton, Ohio, and Worcester. Around 1900, Jones founded an engineering and consulting firm that employed 10 to 15 engineers.

The offices of I.W. Jones Engineers were on Main Street in Milton. The firm specialized in dams, water wheels and turbines, mill buildings and hydroelectric plants and undertook contracts all over New England, the southern states and Canada.

I W Jones Eng'r. projects

See also

 Economy of New Hampshire

References

Construction and civil engineering companies of the United States
Defunct engineering companies of the United States
Defunct companies based in New Hampshire
Companies based in Strafford County, New Hampshire
Construction and civil engineering companies established in 1899
Design companies disestablished in 1930
1899 establishments in New Hampshire
1930 disestablishments in New Hampshire
Privately held companies based in New Hampshire
Defunct privately held companies of the United States
American companies established in 1899
American companies disestablished in 1930